Rob Roy is an operetta by composer Reginald De Koven and lyricist Harry B. Smith, frequent collaborators, loosely based upon the life of Scottish folk hero Robert Roy MacGregor, better known as Rob Roy, and the Walter Scott novel about him.

Rob Roy, designated "A Romantic-Comic Opera in 3 Acts", opens with a formal overture. The history-conflating plot covers the adventures of Rob Roy, a highland chieftain secretly married to the daughter of the mayor of Perth, and Bonnie Prince Charlie, the young pretender to the throne of Scotland, who in reality didn't set foot in Scotland until 11 years after the MacGregor's death. It included several songs in imitation of Scottish folk tunes.

Performance history
Rob Roy premiered in Detroit on October 1, 1894.  It opened in New York on October 29, 1894, at the Herald Square Theatre and ran for 235 performances, closing on March 23, 1895. A review in The New York Times faulted it only for failing to match the high standard its creators set for themselves in their earlier Robin Hood (1890), though it identified the first act finale and Flora's song in the second act as De Koven and Smith's best work to date. It called Rob Roy "a thoroughly good operetta ... clean, frank, manly, bright, and winsome ... a right good comedy".

Roles
Rob Roy MacGregor, a Highland Chief, tenor
Janet, daughter of the Mayor
Prince Charles Edward Stuart, called the 'Young Pretender'
Flora MacDonald, heiress of a Chief of the Clan MacDonald, a partisan of the Pretender
Dugald MacWheeble, Mayor of Perth
Lochiel, a Highlander, otherwise Donald Cameron of the Cameron Clan
Captain Ralph Sheridan, of King George's Grenadiers
Sandy MacSherry, town crier
Tammas MacSorlie, the Mayor's henchman
Lieut. Cornwallis, of King George's Grenadiers
Lieut. Clinton
Angus MacAllister
Duncan Campbell
Stuart MacPherson
Donald MacAlpine
Nelly, bar-maid of 'The Crown and Thistle'
Highlanders, Lowland townsmen, Watchmen, English Grenadiers, Drummer boys etc.

Show cocktail
A whisky-based Rob Roy cocktail, created on the occasion of the operetta's 1894 New York premiere by a bartender at the Waldorf Hotel, imitates the reddish colour of Rob Roy's hair.

References

External links
Vocal score, includes plot summary

English-language operettas
Operas set in Scotland
Operas set in the 18th century
Operas based on real people
1894 operas
Operas
Cultural depictions of Rob Roy MacGregor
Operas based on works by Walter Scott